Oleh Volodymyrovych Mishchenko (born 10 October 1989) is a Ukrainian former professional football midfielder.

Career
He is a product of the FC Dynamo Kyiv sportive school.

Mishchenko was loaned several times to different Ukrainian clubs, including FC Zakarpattia Uzhhorod in the Ukrainian Premier League.

On 9 February 2016, he moved to the Russian Premier League, signing a contract with FC Amkar Perm. Amkar released him from his contract on 2 June 2017.

References

External links 

1989 births
Footballers from Kyiv
Living people
Ukrainian footballers
FC Metalurh Donetsk players
FC Hoverla Uzhhorod players
FC Stal Alchevsk players
FC Vorskla Poltava players
Association football forwards
Ukrainian Premier League players
FC Amkar Perm players
Ukrainian expatriate footballers
Expatriate footballers in Russia
Russian Premier League players
Ukrainian expatriate sportspeople in Russia
FC Mariupol players
Ukraine youth international footballers
FC Polissya Zhytomyr players